Tirur is a city in Kerala, India. It may also refer to:
 Tirur Taluk, a Taluka in Kerala
 Tirur (State Assembly constituency), a constituency in Kerala
 Tirur railway station, a railway station in Kerala